The 2009 Kansas City Royals season was the 41st season for the franchise, and their 39th at Kauffman Stadium. The season began on April 7 with a game against the Chicago White Sox at U. S. Cellular Field, which Chicago won. On April 10, the Royals hosted the New York Yankees in the first game at the newly renovated Kauffman Stadium for the Royals' home opener. Interleague opponents included the St. Louis Cardinals, Arizona Diamondbacks, Cincinnati Reds, Houston Astros and Pittsburgh Pirates.

The Royals looked to improve on their 2008 record of 75–87 and sought their first playoff appearance since 1985, as manager Trey Hillman returned for his second season with Kansas City.  The Royals' payroll for the 2009 season was $70.5 million, approximately 25 percent higher than their 2008 payroll (and 21st in the major leagues).

There was much optimism for the Royals heading into the season, with some experts saying they had the potential reach the postseason. After a strong start and 18–11 record, the Royals suffered several losing streaks and fell back to a losing record, finishing with a dismal 65-97 record.

Off-season

Coaching staff changes
Following the 2008 season, third base coach Luis Silverio and hitting coach Mike Barnett were not retained on Trey Hillman's coaching staff. In October 2008, the Royals hired Kevin Seitzer as the team's new hitting coach and John Gibbons as bench coach. Seitzer served as the hitting coach for the Arizona Diamondbacks in 2008, and Gibbons was the manager of the Toronto Blue Jays for five seasons. Both were dismissed from their respective teams before the 2007 season was completed. Dave Owen, the team's bench coach from 2008, will be the third base coach. Bob McClure (pitching), Rusty Kuntz (first base), and John Mizerock (bullpen) were all retained to complete the six-man staff.

Winter meetings
After the acquisitions of Mike Jacobs and Coco Crisp, the Royals entered the Winter Meetings not seeking to add another big free agent acquisition like in years past (Gil Meche in 2007 and José Guillén in 2008). Through trades, Kansas City sought to acquire relief pitching, a middle infielder, and a starting pitcher. The Royals pursued both RHP Kyle Farnsworth and RHP Brandon Lyon, and signed Farnsworth to a two-year contract. The Royals also signed LHP Horacio Ramírez, who was previously with the team in 2008, and RHP Doug Waechter.

The Royals were also one of the final four teams that were in talks with SS Rafael Furcal. The acquisition of Furcal would have resulted in the Royals moving SS Mike Avilés to second base. Furcal played with the Atlanta Braves, where Royals general manager Dayton Moore worked prior to joining the Royals' front office. Reports said that Kansas City was maneuvering to clear payroll so that they could sign Furcal, or sign Orlando Cabrera, who was in the Royals' backup plan. Kansas City bowed out of talks with Furcal after they could not work around their payroll.

The Boston Globe reported that the Royals had "serious discussions" concerning a trade of RHP Zack Greinke to the Atlanta Braves for OF Jeff Francoeur. Reports about Kansas City's purported interest in Francoeur also surfaced weeks before the Winter Meetings but there had been no concrete evidence that the Royals pursued such a deal. Dayton Moore quickly denied the report. Moore showed a reluctance to trade Greinke or outfielders Mark Teahen and David DeJesus, all of whom were attached to rumors throughout the off-season.

Roster moves

Kansas City entered the 2008–2009 off-season with 15 players eligible for arbitration.

 LHP John Bale (re-signed)
 RHP Brian Bannister
 C John Buck
 RHP Kyle Davies
 RHP Brandon Duckworth
 OF Joey Gathright (released)
 IF/OF Esteban Germán
 LHP Jimmy Gobble
 RHP Zack Greinke
 2B Mark Grudzielanek (declined)
 1B Mike Jacobs
 C Miguel Olivo
 RHP Joel Peralta
 IF Jason Smith
 IF/OF Mark Teahen

In October, the Royals acquired 1B Mike Jacobs from the Florida Marlins in exchange for SP Leo Núñez.

In November, the Royals acquired CF Coco Crisp from the Boston Red Sox in exchange for RP Ramón Ramírez.

In December, the Royals did not tender contracts to OF Joey Gathright, LHP John Bale, RHP Jairo Cuevas, and 2B Jason Smith. Bale was later re-signed on a one-year deal,

In January, the Royals agreed to a four-year, $38 million contract with RHP Zack Greinke.

Regular season

Season standings

Record vs. opponents

Monthly summaries

April

The Royals' season opener against the Chicago White Sox was originally scheduled for April 6 but was postponed due to snow forecasts in the Chicago area. The game was rescheduled for April 7, which was originally an off-day for both teams. The Royals lost the first game of the season after Kyle Farnsworth gave up a game-losing, three-run homer to Chicago's Jim Thome. After losing the first game to Chicago, the Royals won two of three games against Chicago to open the series. The Royals played the New York Yankees on April 10 at the newly renovated Kauffman Stadium for their home opener. It was the first game of a three-game series. Kansas City lost the first two games and trailed late in the 8th inning of the third game before Brayan Peña scored a game-tying RBI double and then scored the go-ahead run on Alberto Callaspo's RBI single. Peña is the team's third-string catcher and was listed as designated hitter for the day. The Royals would hold on to the 6–4 lead for their third win on the season.

On April 17 the Royals began a three-game series with the Texas Rangers and eventually won two of them. On that day, 3B Alex Gordon was placed on the disabled list and was ruled out for at least two months after having surgery to repair a torn labrum in his right hip. Despite the bad news, the Royals beat the Rangers 12–3 in the opening game of the series. In the second game against the Rangers (on April 18), RHP Zack Greinke recorded his first career shut-out and extended his scoreless inning streak to 34. The streak dated back to the 2008 Kansas City Royals season. This brought Greinke's statistics to three wins in three starts and an 0.00 ERA, the best in the American League at the time. Texas' Kevin Millwood, who started for the Rangers, had the American League's second lowest ERA entering the game with a 0.64 ERA. The Royals entered the third game of the series against Texas looking for their first series sweep of the season. After trailing 5–3 in the bottom of the eighth, the Rangers tied the game at 5 by the ninth inning after Royals set up pitchers Ron Mahay and Jamie Wright allowed two runs. Texas' Michael Young hit a game-winning leadoff home run off of reliever Kyle Farnsworth's second pitch of the inning. The loss brought Kansas City down to a three-way tie for first place in the American League Central with Detroit and Chicago. Royals manager Trey Hillman kept closer Joakim Soria in the bullpen for the entire series instead reasoning that he didn't want Soria to be used for more than one inning in the third game. RHP Brian Bannister was recalled from Triple-A Omaha to pitch for Kansas City on April 22 and replaced both the injured Doug Waechter, who was placed on the DL, and the struggling Horacio Ramírez in the pitching rotation. Bannister and Jamie Wright pitched eight shut-out innings before closer Joakim Soria returned from an eight-day hiatus to close out the 2–0 victory. Soria battled injuries for most of the month.

Zack Greinke's scoreless innings streak ended at 38 when an unearned run was scored after an errant throw by Mike Avilés in a 6–1 Royals victory over the Detroit Tigers. The run was unearned so Greinke's ERA stayed at 0.00 and his record improved to 4-0 on the season. The game was also Greinke's second complete game of the season. Greinke was featured on the cover of Sports Illustrateds May 4, 2009, issue (Volume 110, Issue 18) for a cover story by Joe Posnanski called "The Best Pitcher in Baseball." Greinke is the first Royals player to appear on the magazine cover since pitcher David Cone on April 5, 1993, for the magazine's baseball preview. The last Kansas City player to appear in an in-season cover was back on June 12, 1989, when SI featured outfielder Bo Jackson.

The team won three of four games against the Toronto Blue Jays, who entered the series with baseball's best record. On April 29 Zack Greinke was the first pitcher of the season to record his fifth win and allowed only two runs to the Blue Jays in an 11–3 victory. This brought his ERA for the season from 0.00 to 0.50. By finishing with a 12-10 record for the month, the Royals registered their first winning April since 2003 when they began the season with a 16-7 record.

May

The Royals entered the month of May in sole-possession of first place in the American League Central. They traveled to the Hubert H. Humphrey Metrodome to play the Minnesota Twins in a three-game series to start off the month. The series was hotly contested with the Royals scoring 22 runs and the Twins scoring 19 and several lead changes. The second game of the series was decided in 11 innings. In the third game, the Royals were no-hit by Scott Baker through six innings before an offensive but then suddenly unleashed an offensive flurry in the seventh, scoring five runs to roar ahead and hold on for a stunning 7–5 victory. Zack Greinke threw his third complete game in a 3–0 shutout of the White Sox on May 4 and improved his record to 6-0 on the year with a 0.40 ERA. Greinke lost his first game of the season to the Los Angeles Angels of Anaheim on May 9 in a 1–0 loss. Greinke pitched a complete game and his ERA rose to 0.51.

Joakim Soria continued to battle injuries to his shoulder and his appearances were limited in the early part of May. He was placed on the disabled list and Sidney Ponson was sent to the bullpen in exchange for Luke Hochevar being called up from Triple-A Omaha. In his first appearance of the season, Hochevar lasted only two innings and allowed eight runs in a 12–3 loss to the Oakland Athletics. Entering the game, Kansas City's team ERA led the American League, but took a hit with Hochevar's performance. By the beginning of the fifth inning, Oakland led the game 12–0 and the Royals never recovered and dropped their fourth consecutive game. The Royals lost all five games of their road trip against the Angels and Athletics after sweeping their four-game homestand against the White Sox and Mariners.

Zack Greinke's eighth start of the season was delayed by two and half hours of rainfall, but the Royals still won the game 8–1 against the Baltimore Orioles. The game was held at Kauffman Stadium and had a sell-out crowd of 38,353 along with many other games in the season selling out for Greinke's starts. The Royals split their four-game home series against the Orioles.

On May 19, Kansas City trailed Cleveland 5–2 entering the ninth inning but accomplished their biggest comeback victory of the season. After two consecutive home runs by Mike Jacobs and Mark Teahen, the Royals rallied to a 6–5 victory after a sacrifice fly by Willie Bloomquist brought David DeJesus home for the winning run.

Kansas City began Interleague play against their cross-state rival St. Louis Cardinals. After losing the first two games of the series by scores of 5–0, the Royals fell to a 21-22 record and under the .500 mark for the first time since April 11 when they were 2-3. After optioning three players (Mike Avilés, Luke Hochevar, and Robinson Tejeda) to the inactive roster, Kansas City won the final game 3–2 and regained a .500 record on the season.

By the end of the month, the Royals began to slip from the top of their division standings in the American League Central, especially following a three-game sweep by the Chicago White Sox left the team with a 23–27 record. An 11–17 record in May dropped the Royals down to fourth place in the division.

June
Looking to rebound from a sub-par month of May, the Royals began June with a three-game series at Tampa Bay on June 2, but continued to flounder, dropping all three games. They lost their eighth game in a row on June 5 at Toronto, but broke the losing streak the next day thanks to a strong performance from Luke Hochevar. In the 2009 Major League Baseball draft held on June 9 the Royals selected RHP Aaron Crow with the 12th overall selection. Crow attended the University of Missouri, was born in nearby Topeka, Kansas, and was a longtime Royals fan prior to being selected with the team. That same day, the Royals' defense and bullpen allowed eight unanswered runs to the Indians in an 8–4 loss. The loss dropped the Royals to fifth place in the American League Central.

Roster

Game log 

|- bgcolor="ffbbbb"
|- align="center" bgcolor="bbbbbb"
| || April 6 || @ White Sox || colspan=6 |Postponed
|- align="center" bgcolor="ffbbbb"
| 1 || April 7 || @ White Sox || 4–2 || Dotel (1–0) || Farnsworth (0–1) || Jenks (1) || 37,449 || 0–1
|- align="center" bgcolor="bbffbb"
| 2 || April 8 || @ White Sox || 2–0 || Greinke (1–0) || Floyd (0–1) || Soria (1) || 22,817 || 1–1
|- align="center" bgcolor="bbffbb"
| 3 || April 9 || @ White Sox || 2–1 || Mahay (1–0) || Jenks (0–1) || Soria (2) || 18,091 || 2–1
|- align="center" bgcolor="ffbbbb"
| 4 || April 10 || Yankees || 4–1 || Pettitte (1–0) || Ponson (0–1) || Rivera (1) || 38,098 || 2–2
|- align="center" bgcolor="ffbbbb"
| 5 || April 11 || Yankees || 6–1 || Sabathia (1–1) || Ramírez (0–1) || || 31,271 || 2–3
|- align="center" bgcolor="bbffbb"
| 6 || April 12 || Yankees || 6–4 || Cruz (1–0) || Coke (0–1) || Soria (3) || 17,629 || 3–3
|- align="center" bgcolor="bbffbb"
| 7 || April 13 || Indians || 4–2 || Greinke (2–0) || Carmona (0–2) || Soria (4) || 10,061 || 4–3
|- align="center" bgcolor="bbffbb"
| 8 || April 14 || Indians || 9–3 || Davies (1–0) || Pavano (0–2) || || 11,756 || 5–3
|- align="center" bgcolor="ffbbbb"
| 9 || April 15 || Indians || 5–4 || Lewis (1–0) || Farnsworth (0–2) || Wood (1) || 13,589 || 5–4
|- align="center" bgcolor="bbffbb"
| 10 || April 17 || @ Rangers || 12–3 || Meche (1–0) || Harrison (0–2) || || 24,062 || 6–4
|- align="center" bgcolor="bbffbb"
| 11 || April 18 || @ Rangers || 2–0 || Greinke (3–0) || Millwood (1–1) || || 37,635 || 7–4
|- align="center" bgcolor="ffbbbb"
| 12 || April 19 || @ Rangers || 6–5 || Francisco (1–0) || Farnsworth (0–3) || || 27,635 || 7–5
|- align="center" bgcolor="ffbbbb"
| 13 || April 21 || @ Indians || 8–7 || Laffey (1–0) || Ponson (0–2) || Wood (2) || 11,408 || 7–6
|- align="center" bgcolor="bbffbb"
| 14 || April 22 || @ Indians || 2–0 || Bannister (1–0) || Lee (1–3) || Soria (5) || 13,509 || 8–6
|- align="center" bgcolor="ffbbbb"
| 15 || April 23 || @ Indians || 5–2 || Lewis (2–2) || Meche (1–1) || Wood (3) || 12,852 || 8–7
|- align="center" bgcolor="bbffbb"
| 16 || April 24 || Tigers || 6–1 || Greinke (4–0) || Porcello (1–2) || || 36,363 || 9–7
|- align="center" bgcolor="ffbbbb"
| 17 || April 25 || Tigers || 9–1 || Miner (2–1) || Davies (1–1) || || 37,647 || 9–8
|- align="center" bgcolor="ffbbbb"
| 18 || April 26 || Tigers || 3–2 || Galarraga (3–0) || Ponson (0–3) || Rodney (4) || 13,520 || 9–9
|- align="center" bgcolor="bbffbb"
| 19 || April 27 || Blue Jays || 7–1 || Bannister (2–0) || Purcey (0–2) || || 9,685 || 10–9
|- align="center" bgcolor="ffbbbb"
| 20 || April 28 || Blue Jays || 8–1 || Richmond (3–0) || Meche (1–2) || || 15,191 || 10–10
|- align="center" bgcolor="bbffbb"
| 21 || April 29 || Blue Jays || 11–3 || Greinke (5–0) || Tallet (1–1) || || 10,619 || 11–10
|- align="center" bgcolor="bbffbb"
| 22 || April 30 || Blue Jays || 8–6 || Davies (2–1) || Burres (0–2) || Cruz (1) || 11,896 || 12–10
|-

|- bgcolor="ffbbbb"
|- align="center" bgcolor="ffbbbb"
| 23 || May 1 || @ Twins || 7–5 || Slowey (4–0) || Ponson (0–4) || Nathan (4) || 24,727 || 12–11
|- align="center" bgcolor="bbffbb"
| 24 || May 2 || @ Twins || 10 – 7 (11) || Soria (1–0) || Breslow (0–1) || || 29,061 || 13–11
|- align="center" bgcolor="bbffbb"
| 25 || May 3 || @ Twins || 7–5 || Meche (2–2) || Baker (0–4) || Soria (6) || 31,845 || 14–11
|- align="center" bgcolor="bbffbb"
| 26 || May 4 || White Sox || 3–0 || Greinke (6–0) || Colón (2–2) || || 21,843 || 15–11
|- align="center" bgcolor="bbffbb"
| 27 || May 5 || White Sox || 8 – 7 (11) || Cruz (2–0) || Broadway (0–1) || || 13,419 || 16–11
|- align="center" bgcolor="bbffbb"
| 28 || May 6 || Mariners || 9–1 || Ponson (1–4) || Silva (1–3) || || 15,324 || 17–11
|- align="center" bgcolor="bbffbb"
| 29 || May 7 || Mariners || 3–1 || Bannister (3–0) || Washburn (3–2) || Soria (7) || 32,714 || 18–11
|- align="center" bgcolor="ffbbbb"
| 30 || May 8 || @ Angels || 4–1 || Palmer (3–0) || Meche (2–3) || Fuentes (8) || 41,019 || 18–12
|- align="center" bgcolor="ffbbbb"
| 31 || May 9 || @ Angels || 1–0 || Saunders (5–1) || Greinke (6–1) || || 39,776 || 18–13
|- align="center" bgcolor="ffbbbb"
| 32 || May 10 || @ Angels || 4–3 || Shields (1–2) || Wright (0–1) || Fuentes (9) || 43,646 || 18–14
|- align="center" bgcolor="ffbbbb"
| 33 || May 12 || @ Athletics || 12–3 || Cahill (2–2) || Hochevar (0–1) || || 10,156 || 18–15
|- align="center" bgcolor="ffbbbb"
| 34 || May 13 || @ Athletics || 7–2 || Outman (1–0) || Bannister (3–1) || || 16,057 || 18–16
|- align="center" bgcolor="ffbbbb"
| 35 || May 14 || Orioles || 9–5 || Guthrie (3–3) || Meche (2–4) || || 24,431 || 18–17
|- align="center" bgcolor="bbffbb"
| 36 || May 15 || Orioles || 8–1 || Greinke (7–1) || Eaton (2–4) || || 38,353 || 19–17
|- align="center" bgcolor="ffbbbb"
| 37 || May 16 || Orioles || 3–2 || Hill (1–0) || Davies (2–2) || Sherrill (7) || 26,720 || 19–18
|- align="center" bgcolor="bbffbb"
| 38 || May 17 || Orioles || 7–4 || Cruz (3–0) || Johnson (2–2) || || 22,791 || 20–18
|- align="center" bgcolor="bbffbb"
| 39 || May 19 || Indians || 6–5 || Farnsworth (1–3) || Wood (1–2) || || 25,024 || 21–18
|- align="center" bgcolor="ffbbbb"
| 40 || May 20 || Indians || 6–5 || Laffey (3–0) || Ponson (1–5) || Wood (6) || 19,652 || 21–19
|- align="center" bgcolor="ffbbbb"
| 41 || May 21 || Indians || 8–3 || Pavano (4–4) || Ramírez (0–2) || Betancourt (1) || 23,095 || 21–20
|- align="center" bgcolor="ffbbbb"
| 42 || May 22 || @ Cardinals || 5–0 || Wellemeyer (4–4) || Davies (2–3) || || 43,429 || 21–21
|- align="center" bgcolor="ffbbbb"
| 43 || May 23 || @ Cardinals || 5–0 || Lohse (4–3) || Hochevar (0–2) || || 43,829 || 21–22
|- align="center" bgcolor="bbffbb"
| 44 || May 24 || @ Cardinals || 3–2 || Bannister (4–1) || Piñeiro (5–4) || Cruz (2) || 44,213 || 22–22
|- align="center" bgcolor="ffbbbb"
| 45 || May 25 || Tigers || 13–1 || Verlander (5–2) || Meche (2–5) || || 34,524 || 22–23
|- align="center" bgcolor="bbffbb"
| 46 || May 26 || Tigers || 6–1 || Greinke (8–1) || Jackson (4–3) || || 16,366 || 23–23
|- align="center" bgcolor="ffbbbb"
| 47 || May 27 || Tigers || 8–3 || Porcello (6–3) || Davies (2–4) || || 16,568 || 23–24
|- align="center" bgcolor="ffbbbb"
| 48 || May 29 || White Sox || 11–2 || Richard (2–0) || Bannister (4–2) || || 26,495 || 23–25
|- align="center" bgcolor="ffbbbb"
| 49 || May 30 || White Sox || 5–3 || Linebrink (2–2) || Cruz (3–1) || Jenks (11) || 37,894 || 23–26
|- align="center" bgcolor="ffbbbb"
| 50 || May 31 || White Sox || 7–4 || Thornton (2–1) || Bale (0–1) || Jenks (12) || 19,855 || 23–27
|-

|- bgcolor="ffbbbb"
|- align="center" bgcolor="ffbbbb"
| 51 || June 2 || @ Rays || 6–2 || Sonnanstine (4–5) || Davies (2–5) || || 13,604 || 23–28
|- align="center" bgcolor="ffbbbb"
| 52 || June 3 || @ Rays || 9–0 || Niemann (5–4) || Bannister (4–3) || || 15,256 || 23–29
|- align="center" bgcolor="ffbbbb"
| 53 || June 4 || @ Rays || 3–2 || Shields (5–4) || Wright (0–2) || Howell (2) || 16,103 || 23–30
|- align="center" bgcolor="ffbbbb"
| 54 || June 5 || @ Blue Jays || 9–3 || Romero (3–2) || Greinke (8–2) || || 15,435 || 23–31
|- align="center" bgcolor="bbffbb"
| 55 || June 6 || @ Blue Jays || 6–2 || Hochevar (1–2) || Richmond (4–3) || || 16,552 || 24–31
|- align="center" bgcolor="ffbbbb"
| 56 || June 7 || @ Blue Jays || 4–0 || Halladay (10–1) || Davies (2–6) || || 21,071 || 24–32
|- align="center" bgcolor="ffbbbb"
| 57 || June 9 || @ Indians || 8–4 || Pérez (1–1) || Cruz (3–2) || || 15,038 || 24–33
|- align="center" bgcolor="bbffbb"
| 58 || June 10 || @ Indians || 9–0 || Meche (3–5) || Pavano (6–5) || || 16,257 || 25–33
|- align="center" bgcolor="ffbbbb"
| 59 || June 11 || @ Indians || 4 – 3 (10) || Herges (2–0) || Farnsworth (1–4) || || 14,342 || 25–34
|- align="center" bgcolor="bbffbb"
| 60 || June 12 || Reds || 4–1 || Hochevar (2–2) || Maloney (0–1) || || 32,959 || 26–34
|- align="center" bgcolor="bbffbb"
| 61 || June 13 || Reds || 7–4 || Davies (3–6) || Arroyo (7–5) || || 29,574 || 27–34
|- align="center" bgcolor="bbffbb"
| 62 || June 14 || Reds || 7–1 || Bannister (5–3) || Cueto (6–4) || || 24,525 || 28–34
|- align="center" bgcolor="bbffbb"
| 63 || June 16 || Diamondbacks || 5–0 || Meche (4–5) || Davis (3–8) || || 26,974 || 29–34
|- align="center" bgcolor="ffbbbb"
| 64 || June 17 || Diamondbacks || 12–5 || Scherzer (4–4) || Greinke (8–3) || || 29,777 || 29–35
|- align="center" bgcolor="ffbbbb"
| 65 || June 18 || Diamondbacks || 12–5 || Haren (6–4) || Hochevar (2–3) || || 14,129 || 29–36
|- align="center" bgcolor="ffbbbb"
| 66 || June 19 || Cardinals || 10–5 || Thompson (2–2) || Davies (3–7) || || 37,660 || 29–37
|- align="center" bgcolor="ffbbbb"
| 67 || June 20 || Cardinals || 7–1 || Carpenter (5–1) || Bannister (5–4) || Franklin (17) || 38,769 || 29–38
|- align="center" bgcolor="ffbbbb"
| 68 || June 21 || Cardinals || 12–5 || Wainwright (8–4) || Meche (4–6) || || 33,805 || 29–39
|- align="center" bgcolor="bbffbb"
| 69 || June 23 || @ Astros || 2–1 || Greinke (9–3) || Ortiz (3–3) || Soria (8) || 30,049 || 30–39
|- align="center" bgcolor="bbffbb"
| 70 || June 24 || @ Astros || 4–3 || Soria (2–0) || Fulchino (2–3) || Bale (1) || 28,602 || 31–39
|- align="center" bgcolor="ffbbbb"
| 71 || June 25 || @ Astros || 5–4 || Wright (2–1) || Bannister (5–5) || Valverde (6) || 32,048 || 31–40
|- align="center" bgcolor="ffbbbb"
| 72 || June 26 || @ Pirates || 5–3 || Vasquez (1–0) || Meche (4–7) || Capps (17) || 18,458 || 31–41
|- align="center" bgcolor="ffbbbb"
| 73 || June 27 || @ Pirates || 6–2 || Maholm (5–4) || Chen (0–1) || || 36,032 || 31–42
|- align="center" bgcolor="bbffbb"
| 74 || June 28 || @ Pirates || 3–2 || Greinke (10–3) || Morton (0–1) || Soria (9) || 25,888 || 32–42
|- align="center" bgcolor="bbffbb"
| 75 || June 29 || Twins || 4–2 || Hochevar (3–3) || Blackburn (6–4) || Soria (10) || 22,066 || 33–42
|- align="center" bgcolor="ffbbbb"
| 76 || June 30 || Twins || 2–1 || Baker (6–6) || Bannister (5–6) || Nathan (20) || 19,310 || 33–43
|-

|- bgcolor="ffbbbb"
|- align="center" bgcolor="ffbbbb"
| 77 || July 1 || Twins || 5–1 || Perkins (4–4) || Meche (4–8) || Nathan (21) || 18,906 || 33–44
|- align="center" bgcolor="ffbbbb"
| 78 || July 2 || White Sox || 4–1 || Buehrle (8–2) || Chen (0–2) || Jenks (19) || 17,964 || 33–45
|- align="center" bgcolor="ffbbbb"
| 79 || July 3 || White Sox || 5–0 || Danks (7–6) ||Greinke (10–4) || Linebrink (2) || 39,026 || 33–46
|- align="center" bgcolor="bbffbb"
| 80 || July 4 || White Sox || 6–4 || Hochevar (4–3) || Floyd (6–6) || Soria (11) || 18,182 || 34–46
|- align="center" bgcolor="bbffbb"
| 81 || July 5 || White Sox || 6–3 || Bannister (6–6) || Richard (3–2) || Soria (12) || 15,915 || 35–46
|- align="center" bgcolor="bbffbb"
| 82 || July 6 || @ Tigers || 4–3 || Colón (1–0) || Rodney (0–2) || Soria (13) || 32,134 || 36–46
|- align="center" bgcolor="ffbbbb"
| 83 || July 7 || @ Tigers || 8–5 || Verlander (9–4) || Chen (0–3) || Rodney (18) || 29,751 || 36–47
|- align="center" bgcolor="ffbbbb"
| 84 || July 8 || @ Tigers || 3–1 || French (1–0) || Greinke (10–5) || Rodney (19) || 29,104 || 36–48
|- align="center" bgcolor="bbffbb"
| 85 || July 9 || @ Red Sox || 8–4 || Hochevar (5–3) || Masterson (3–3) || Soria (14) || 38,189 || 37–48
|- align="center" bgcolor="ffbbbb"
| 86 || July 10 || @ Red Sox || 1–0 || Lester (8–6) || Bannister (6–7) || Papelbon (23) || 38,116 || 37–49
|- align="center" bgcolor="ffbbbb"
| 87 || July 11 || @ Red Sox || 15–9 || Smoltz (1–2) || Meche (4–9) || || 37,825 || 37–50
|- align="center" bgcolor="ffbbbb"
| 88 || July 12 || @ Red Sox || 6–0 || Beckett (11–3) || Chen (0–4) || || 37,612 || 37–51
|- align="center" bgcolor="ffbbbb"
| 89 || July 17 || Rays || 8–7 || Nelson (3–0) || Cruz (3–3) || Howell (7) || 33,568 || 37–52
|- align="center" bgcolor="ffbbbb"
| 90 || July 18 || Rays || 4–2 || Bradford (1–0) || Cruz (3–4) || || 30,288 || 37–53
|- align="center" bgcolor="ffbbbb"
| 91 || July 19 || Rays || 4–3 || Balfour (4–1) || Wright (0–3) || Howell (9) || 18,934 || 37–54
|- align="center" bgcolor="bbbbbb"
| | || July 20 || Angels || colspan=6 |Postponed (rain); Rescheduled for July 21
|- align="center" bgcolor="ffbbbb"
| 92 || July 21 || Angels || 8–5 || Santana (3–5) || Ponson (1–6) || Fuentes (29) || N/A || 37–55
|- align="center" bgcolor="ffbbbb"
| 93 || July 21 || Angels || 10–2 || O'Sullivan (3–0) || Chen (0–5) || || 23,874 || 37–56
|- align="center" bgcolor="ffbbbb"
| 94 || July 22 || Angels || 9–6 || Speier (4–2) || Colón (1–1) || Fuentes (30) || 18,078 || 37–57
|- align="center" bgcolor="ffbbbb"
| 95 || July 24 || Rangers || 2–0 || Feldman (9–3) || Greinke (10–6) || Wilson (10) || 25,012 || 37–58
|- align="center" bgcolor="bbffbb"
| 96 || July 25 || Rangers || 6–3 || Hochevar (6–3) || Holland (3–6) || Soria (15) || 27,602 || 38–58
|- align="center" bgcolor="ffbbbb"
| 97 || July 26 || Rangers || 7–2 || Nippert (3–0) || Mahay (1–1) || || 16,847 || 38–59
|- align="center" bgcolor="bbffbb"
| 98 || July 27 || @ Orioles || 5–3 || Tejeda (1–0) || Albers (1–4) || Soria (16) || 15,169 || 39–59
|- align="center" bgcolor="bbffbb"
| 99 || July 28 || @ Orioles || 4 – 3 (11) || Wright (1–3) || Báez (4–4) || Soria (17) || 21,545 || 40–59
|- align="center" bgcolor="ffbbbb"
| 100 || July 29 || @ Orioles || 7–3 || Albers (2–4) || Tejeda (1–1) || Johnson (2) || 19,741 || 40–60
|- align="center" bgcolor="ffbbbb"
| 101 || July 30 || @ Orioles || 7–3 || Bergesen (7–5) || Hochevar (6–4) || || 19,194 || 40–61
|- align="center" bgcolor="ffbbbb"
| 103 || July 31 || @ Rays || 8–2 || Price (4–4) || Ponson (1–7) || || 26,596 || 40–62
|-

|- align="center" bgcolor="ffbbbb"
| 103 || August 1 || @ Rays || 7–1 || Niemann (10–5) || Chen (0–6) || || 36,973 || 40–63
|- align="center" bgcolor="bbffbb"
| 104 || August 2 || @ Rays || 4–1 || Bannister (7–7) || Shields (6–8) || Soria (18) || 27,930 || 41–63
|- align="center" bgcolor="ffbbbb"
| 105 || August 3 || @ Rays || 10–4 || Kazmir (6–6) || Greinke (10–7) || || 24,219 || 41–64
|- align="center" bgcolor="ffbbbb"
| 106 || August 4 || Mariners || 7–6 || Kelley (3–1) || Wright (1–4) || Aardsma (26) || 15,057 || 41–65
|- align="center" bgcolor="ffbbbb"
| 107 || August 5 || Mariners || 11–6 || French (2–2) || Davies (3–8) || || 27,805 || 41–66
|- align="center" bgcolor="bbffbb"
| 108 || August 6 || Mariners || 8–2 || Chen (1–6) || Vargas (3–6) || || 15,103 || 42–66
|- align="center" bgcolor="ffbbbb"
| 109 || August 7 || Athletics || 9–4 || Mazzaro (3–8) || Bannister(7–8) || || 21,918 || 42–67
|- align="center" bgcolor="bbffbb"
| 110 || August 8 || Athletics || 12–6 || Greinke (11–7) || Mortensen(0–1) || || 29,818 || 43–67
|- align="center" bgcolor="ffbbbb"
| 111 || August 9 || Athletics || 6–3 || Anderson (7–8) || Hochevar (6–5) || Bailey (16) || 19,439 || 43–68
|- align="center" bgcolor="bbffbb"
| 112 || August 11 || @ Twins || 14–6 || Davies (4–8) || Blackburn (8–7) || || 32,121 || 44–68
|- align="center" bgcolor="ffbbbb"
| 113 || August 12 || @ Twins || 7–1 || Liriano (5–11) || Bannister (7–9) || || 30,105 || 44–69
|- align="center" bgcolor="bbffbb"
| 114 || August 13 || @ Twins || 5–4 || Meche (5–9) || Pavano (10–9) || Soria (19) || 32,373 || 45–69
|- align="center" bgcolor="ffbbbb"
| 115 || August 14 || @ Tigers || 1–0 || Lyon (5–4) || Colón (1–2) || || 34,799 || 45–70
|- align="center" bgcolor="ffbbbb"
| 116 || August 15 || @ Tigers || 0–3 || Jackson (6–6) || Hochevar (9–5) || || 37,276 || 45–71
|- align="center" bgcolor="bbffbb"
| 117 || August 16 || @ Tigers || 3 – 2 (10) || Soria (3–0) || Rodney (2–3) || || 32,888 || 46–71
|- align="center" bgcolor="ffbbbb"
| 118 || August 17 || @ White Sox || 8–7 || Linebrink (3–5) || Colón (1–3) || Jenks (25) || 36,703 || 46–72
|- align="center" bgcolor="bbffbb"
| 119 || August 18 || @ White Sox || 4–5 || Meche (6–9) || García (0–1) || Soria (20) || 28,812 || 47–72
|- align="center" bgcolor="ffbbbb"
| 120 || August 19 || @ White Sox || 4–2 || Contreras (5–11) || Greinke (11–8) || Jenks (26) || 25,786 || 47–73
|- align="center" bgcolor="ffbbbb"
| 121 || August 21 || Twins || 5–4 || Nathan (2–1) || Soria (3–1) || || 22,283 || 47–74
|- align="center" bgcolor="ffbbbb"
| 122 || August 22 || Twins || 8–7 || Duensing (1–1) || Davies (4–9) || Guerrier (1) || 33,811 || 47–75
|- align="center" bgcolor="ffbbbb"
| 123 || August 23 || Twins || 10–3 || Pavano (11–9) || Bannister (7–10) || || 18,680 || 47–76
|- align="center" bgcolor="ffbbbb"
| 124 || August 24 || Indians || 10–6 || Sowers (5–9) || Soria (3–2) || || 11,101 || 47–77
|- align="center" bgcolor="bbffbb"
| 125 || August 25 || Indians || 6–2 || Greinke (12–8) || Masterson (4–5) || || 17,353 || 47–78
|- align="center" bgcolor="ffbbbb"
| 126 || August 26 || Indians || 4–2 || Huff (8–7) || Hochevar (6–7) || Wood (16) || 10,751 || 48–78
|- align="center" bgcolor="bbffbb"
| 127 || August 27 || @ Mariners || 8–4 || Davies (5–9) || Fister (1–1) || || 19,345 || 49–78
|- align="center" bgcolor="ffbbbb"
| 128 || August 28 || @ Mariners || 6–3 || Hernández (13–5) || Bannister (7–11) || Aardsma (31) || 26,714 || 49–79
|- align="center" bgcolor="ffbbbb"
| 129 || August 29 || @ Mariners || 8–4 || Snell (5–9) || Meche (6–10) || || 26,457 || 49–80
|- align="center" bgcolor="bbffbb"
| 130 || August 30 || @ Mariners || 3–0 || Greinke (13–8) || Rowland-Smith (2–2) || || 30,286 || 50–80
|- align="center" bgcolor="ffbbbb"
| 131 || August 31 || @ Athletics || 8–5 || Breslow (6–7) || Hochevar (6–8) || Bailey (21) || 10,376 || 50–81
|-

|- bgcolor="ffbbbb"
|- align="center" bgcolor="bbffbb"
| 132 || September 1 || @ Athletics || 4–3 || Davies (6–9) || Marshall (0–2) || Soria (21) || 10,039 || 51–81
|- align="center" bgcolor="ffbbbb"
| 133 || September 2 || @ Athletics || 10–4 || Cahill (8–12) || Bannister (7–12) || || 13,920 || 51–82
|- align="center" bgcolor="ffbbbb"
| 134 || September 4 || Angels || 2–1 || Weaver (14–5) || Wright (1–5) || Fuentes (38) || 17,447 || 51–83
|- align="center" bgcolor="ffbbbb"
| 135 || September 5 || Angels || 2 – 1 (11) || Jepsen (5–3) || Yabuta (0–1) || Fuentes (39) || 22,628 || 51–84
|- align="center" bgcolor="ffbbbb"
| 136 || September 6 || Angels || 7–2 || Saunders (12–7) || Hochevar (6–9) || || 16,745 || 51–85
|- align="center" bgcolor="bbffbb"
| 137 || September 7 || Angels || 6–3 || Davies (7–9) || Santana (7–8) || Soria (22) || 18,453 || 52–85
|- bgcolor="bbffbb"
| 137 || September 8 || Tigers || 7–5 || Yabuta (1–1) || Seay (5–3) || Soria (23) || 12,032|| 53–85
|- bgcolor="bbffbb"
| 138 || September 9 || Tigers || 5–1 || Tejeda (2–1) || Verlander (16–8) || Soria (24) ||10,584 || 54–85
|- bgcolor="bbffbb"
| 139 || September 10 || Tigers || 7–4 || Colón (2–3) || Miner (6–5) || Rosa (1)|| 12,029 || 55–85
|- align="center" bgcolor="bbffbb"
| 141 || September 11 || @ Indians || 2–1 || Wright (2–5) || Veras (4–3) || Soria (25) || 26,006 || 56–85
|- align="center" bgcolor="ffbbbb"
| 142 || September 12 || @ Indians || 13–6 || Huff (10–7) || Hochevar (6–10) || || 24,842 || 56–86
|- align="center" bgcolor="bbffbb"
| 143 || September 13 || @ Indians || 7–0 || Davies (8–9) || Carrasco (0–2) || || 21,153 || 57–86
|- bgcolor="bbffbb"
| 144 || September 15 || @ Tigers || 11–1 || Tejeda (3–1) || Washburn (9–9) || || 20,422 || 58–86
|- bgcolor="ffbbbb"
| 145 || September 16 || @ Tigers || 4–3 || Miner (7–5) || DiNardo (0–1) || Rodney (33)|| 25,400 || 58–87
|- bgcolor="bbffbb"
| 146 || September 17 || @ Tigers || 9–2 || Greinke (14–8)|| Jackson (12–7) || || 26,457 || 59–87
|- align="center" bgcolor="bbffbb"
| 147 || September 18 || @ White Sox || 11–0 || Hochevar (7–10) || Buehrle (12–9) || || 29,179 || 62–87
|- align="center" bgcolor="ffbbbb"
| 148 || September 19 || @ White Sox || 13–3 || Peavy (1–0) || Hughes (0–1) || || 28,329 || 60–88
|- align="center" bgcolor="bbffbb"
| 149 || September 20 || @ White Sox || 2–1 || Tejeda (4–1) || García (2–3) || Soria (26) || 22,798 || 61–88
|- align="center" bgcolor="bbffbb"
| 150 || September 21 || Red Sox || 12–9 || Yabuta (2–1) || Bard (2–2) || Soria (27) || 16,770 || 62–88
|- align="center" bgcolor="bbffbb"
| 151 || September 22 || Red Sox || 5–1 || Greinke (15–8) || Byrd (1–2) || Soria (28) || 21,228 || 63–88
|- align="center" bgcolor="ffbbbb"
| 152 || September 23 || Red Sox || 9–2 || Beckett (16–6) || Hochevar (7–11) || || 18,989 || 63–89
|- align="center" bgcolor="ffbbbb"
| 153 || September 24 || Red Sox || 10–3 || Buchholz (7–3) || Lerew (0–1) || || 20,807 || 63–90
|- align="center" bgcolor="ffbbbb"
| 154 || September 25 || Twins || 9–4 || Pavano (13–11) || Tejeda (4–2) || || 23,307 || 63–91
|- align="center" bgcolor="ffbbbb"
| 155 || September 26 || Twins || 11–6 || Baker (14–9) || DiNardo (0–2) || || 30,690 || 63–92
|- align="center" bgcolor="bbffbb"
| 156 || September 27 || Twins || 4–1 || Greinke (16–8) || Liriano (5–13) || Soria (29) || 28,721 || 64–92
|- align="center" bgcolor="ffbbbb"
| 157 || September 28 || @ Yankees || 8–2 || Gaudin (2–0) || Hochevar (7–12) || || 45,348 || 64–93
|- align="center" bgcolor="ffbbbb"
| 158 || September 29 || @ Yankees || 4–3 || Bruney (5–0) || Farnsworth (1–5) || || 44,794 || 64–94
|- align="center" bgcolor="bbffbb"
| 159 || September 30 || @ Yankees || 4–3 || Wright (3–5) || Marte (1–3) || Soria (30) || 46,956 || 65–94
|-

|- bgcolor="ffbbbb"
|- align="center" bgcolor="ffbbbb"
| 160 || October 2 || @ Twins || 10–7 || Manship (1–1) || DiNardo (0–3) || Nathan (46) || 40,223 || 65–95
|- align="center" bgcolor="ffbbbb"
| 161 || October 3 || @ Twins || 5–4 || Rauch (5–1) || Hughes (0–2) || Nathan (47) || 48,644 || 65–96
|- align="center" bgcolor="ffbbbb"
| 162 || October 4 || @ Twins || 13–4 || Pavano (14–12) || Hochevar (7–13) || || 51,155 || 65–97
|-

Player stats

Batting
Note: G = Games played; AB = At bats; R = Runs scored; H = Hits; 2B = Doubles; 3B = Triples; HR = Home runs; RBI = Runs batted in; AVG = Batting average; SB = Stolen bases

Pitching
Note: W = Wins; L = Losses; ERA = Earned run average; G = Games pitched; GS = Games started; SV = Saves; IP = Innings pitched; H = Hits allowed; R = Runs allowed; ER = Earned runs; BB = Walks; SO = Strikeouts 

Awards and honors

Player of the weekApril 13–19: Zack Greinke, shared with Ian Kinsler (Texas Rangers).

Pitcher of the monthApril: Zack Greinke.

Pepsi clutch performer of the monthApril: Zack Greinke.

 Farm system 

ReferencesKansas City Royals:' Official web site

External links

2009 Kansas City Royals official site
2009 KC Royals at Baseball Reference
2009 Kansas City Royals at Baseball Reference

Kansas City Royals
Kansas City Royals seasons
2009 in sports in Missouri